Lap Dance is a 2014 American drama produced by Datari Turner Productions and directed by Greg Carter. The film's ensemble cast includes Briana Evigan, Kenny Wormald, Robert Hoffman, Ali Cobrin, Datari Turner, James Remar, Mariel Hemingway, Omari Hardwick, Lynn Whitfield, Carmen Electra, Nia Peeples, Stacey Dash, Junie Hoang and LisaRaye.

Plot
The film is described as a modern-day Indecent Proposal, and it revolves around Monica (Ali Cobrin), an aspiring actress who, in order to care for her cancer-stricken father, makes a pact with her fiancé to take a job as an exotic dancer. However, once the pact is broken, the couple's lives are changed forever. The film was released theatrically released domestically by Entertainment One on December 5, 2014.

Production
The film was shot on location in Houston, Texas and Los Angeles in 2013.

References

Further reading
 Black Film, First clip of Lynn Whitfield in Indie Film Lap Dance
 Vibe Vixen, LisaRaye, Stacey Dash, and Lynn Whitfield appear in stripper movie
 BET article: "LisaRaye McCoy, Stacey Dash Star in Lap Dance"
 
 Atlanta Blackstar article: "Producer Datari Turner Says ‘Lap Dance’ is the Greatest Stripper Film Ever"

External links
 
 

2014 films
Films shot in Houston
2014 drama films